Following is a list of teams that will compete during the 2022–23 curling season.

Men
As of October 26, 2022

Women
As of December 29, 2022

Mixed doubles
As of December 1, 2022

References

2022 in curling
2023 in curling
Curling-related lists